This is a list of films produced by the Ollywood film industry based in Bhubaneshwar and Cuttack in 1987:

A-Z

References

1987
Ollywood
Films, Ollywood
1980s in Orissa